In mathematics, the simplest real analytic Eisenstein series is a special function of two variables. It is used in the representation theory of SL(2,R) and in analytic number theory. It is closely related to the Epstein zeta function.

There are many generalizations associated to more complicated groups.

Definition
The Eisenstein series E(z, s) for z = x + iy in the upper half-plane is defined by

for Re(s) > 1, and by analytic continuation for other values of the complex number s. The sum is over all pairs of coprime integers.

Warning: there are several other slightly different definitions. Some authors omit the factor of ½, and some sum over all pairs of integers that are not both zero; which changes the function by a factor of ζ(2s).

Properties

As a function on z
Viewed as a function of z, E(z,s) is a real-analytic eigenfunction of the Laplace operator on H with the eigenvalue s(s-1). In other words, it satisfies the elliptic partial differential equation

     where 

The function E(z, s) is invariant under the action of SL(2,Z) on z in the upper half plane by fractional linear transformations. Together with the previous property, this means that the Eisenstein series is a Maass form, a real-analytic analogue of a classical elliptic modular function.

Warning: E(z, s) is not a square-integrable function of z with respect to the invariant Riemannian metric on H.

As a function on s
The Eisenstein series converges for Re(s)>1, but can be analytically continued to a meromorphic function of s on the entire complex plane, with in the half-plane Re(s)  1/2 a unique  pole of residue 3/π at s = 1 (for all z in H) and infinitely many poles in the strip 0 < Re(s) < 1/2 at  where  corresponds to a non-trivial zero of the Riemann zeta-function. The constant term of the pole at s = 1 is described by the Kronecker limit formula.

The modified function

satisfies the functional equation

analogous to the functional equation for the Riemann zeta function ζ(s).

Scalar product of two different Eisenstein series E(z, s) and E(z, t) is given by the Maass-Selberg relations.

Fourier expansion 
The above properties of the real analytic Eisenstein series, i.e. the functional equation for E(z,s) and E*(z,s) using Laplacian on H, are shown from the fact that E(z,s) has a Fourier expansion:

where

and modified Bessel functions

Epstein zeta function
The Epstein zeta function ζQ(s)  for a positive definite integral quadratic form Q(m, n) = cm2 + bmn +an2 is defined by

It is essentially a special case of the real analytic Eisenstein series for a special value of z, since

for

This zeta function was named after Paul Epstein.

Generalizations
The real analytic Eisenstein series E(z, s) is really the Eisenstein series associated to the discrete subgroup SL(2,Z) of SL(2,R). Selberg described generalizations to other discrete subgroups Γ of SL(2,R), and used these to study the representation of  SL(2,R) on L2(SL(2,R)/Γ). Langlands extended Selberg's work to higher dimensional groups; his notoriously difficult proofs were later simplified by Joseph Bernstein.

See also
Eisenstein series
Kronecker limit formula
Maass form

References
J. Bernstein, Meromorphic continuation of Eisenstein series
.

.
.
A. Selberg, Discontinuous groups and harmonic analysis, Proc. Int. Congr. Math., 1962.
D. Zagier, Eisenstein series and the Riemann zeta-function.
Modular forms
Special functions
Representation theory of Lie groups
Analytic number theory